José Horacio Chiorazzo (born 9 June 1976 in Buenos Aires) is an Argentine footballer who plays as a striker.

Chiorazzo began his career at Club Atlético Lanús in 1996. He later went abroad to play for Real Santa Cruz, Jorge Wilstermann, Bolívar and Real Potosí in the Bolivian league, Aucas in Ecuador, Rangers de Talca in Chile and Colombian side Deportivo Pasto.

During 2004 while playing for Bolívar, Chiorazzo experienced his best year of his football career. The team had a tremendous success in both, domestic and international competitions. With the help of his goals, Bolívar won the Apertura tournament and also reached the Copa Nissan Sudamericana final stage that year. Although Chiorazzo finished as the topscorer in that tournament, the team came short and Boca Juniors claimed the title.

Honours

Individual
Bolívar
Copa Nissan Sudamericana top scorer: 2004 (5 goals)

External links
 
 

1976 births
Living people
Footballers from Buenos Aires
Argentine footballers
Association football forwards
Club Atlético Lanús footballers
Club Bolívar players
C.D. Jorge Wilstermann players
Club Real Potosí players
Rangers de Talca footballers
Club Atlético Sarmiento footballers
Deportivo Pasto footballers
Argentine Primera División players
Categoría Primera A players
Expatriate footballers in Bolivia
Expatriate footballers in Ecuador
Expatriate footballers in Chile
Expatriate footballers in Colombia
Argentine expatriate footballers
Argentine expatriate sportspeople in Chile
Argentine expatriate sportspeople in Colombia
Argentine expatriate sportspeople in Ecuador
Argentine expatriate sportspeople in Bolivia